is a Japanese manga artist. He wrote and illustrated the three volume Mail series. He currently illustrates The Kurosagi Corpse Delivery Service, which is authored by Eiji Ōtsuka.

References

External links

Manga artists
Living people
Year of birth missing (living people)